Repyt, or Repit, was an ancient Egyptian goddess. Typically, she was portrayed as one of the lioness goddesses of Egypt. Her husband was Min.

In ancient times there was a town named Hut-Repyt, where her temple was sited. Later, the town was renamed as Athribis by the Greeks when it began to grow in importance. The site was excavated by Flinders Petrie in 1900. Now called Wannina, the site lies on the west bank of the Nile about 10km southwest of Sohag.

References

Egyptian goddesses
Lion deities
Animal goddesses